Crawdaddy is an album by the British band the Darling Buds.  It was released on Epic Records in 1990 and contains the singles "Tiny Machine" and "Crystal Clear". The band supported the album by touring with Wire Train.

Production
The album was produced by Stephen Street. Jimmy Hughes joined on drums.

Critical reception

Trouser Press wrote: "Some now-tired Blondie-isms remain, but this fine sophomore effort is mostly a forward-looking, groove-heavy delight." The Tampa Bay Times deemed Crawdaddy "full of swirly, danceable melodies and infectious drumbeats." The Record labeled Crawdaddy "an enticing mix of melodic pop enhanced with a hint of hard-driving guitar rock."

Spin called the album "guitar-driven girl pop at its very finest." The Boston Globe considered it "a terse pop-punk manifesto that conveys love's conflicting impulses in an ingratiating, semi-complex, pop context." The Los Angeles Times wrote that the Darling Buds "thicken the pop with dense, twisted textures, lending [the album] an off-center quality."

Track listing
All songs written by Harley Farr and Andrea Lewis
 "It Makes No Difference" (3:55)
 "Tiny Machine" (5:45)
 "Crystal Clear" (3:48)
 "Do You Have To Break My Heart" (3:18)
 "You Won't Make Me Die" (3:45)
 "Fall" (3:56)
 "A Little Bit Of Heaven" (3:46)
 "Honeysuckle" (2:39)
 "So Close" (5:29)
 "The End of the Beginning" (3:33)

Singles

 "Tiny Machine" (1990) 
 "Crystal Clear" (1990)

Members
Andrea Lewis – vocals
Geriant "Harley" Farr – guitar
Chris McDonogh – bass
Jimmy Hughes – drums

References

The Darling Buds albums
1990 albums
Epic Records albums
Albums produced by Stephen Street